"Silent Running (On Dangerous Ground)" is a song performed by Mike + The Mechanics. Written by Mike Rutherford and B. A. Robertson, it was the first track on the 1985 self-titled debut album of Mike + the Mechanics. It was also released as the band's first single, peaking at number 6 on 8 March 1986 on the Billboard Hot 100 chart, and number 1 on Billboard's Mainstream Rock Tracks chart, where it stayed for five weeks. It reached No. 21 in the band's native United Kingdom.

Paul Carrack provided lead vocals on the song. Alan Murphy was hired as a session guitarist and provided lead guitar on the track. The song's original title was simply "Silent Running"; the name extension was given when the song was chosen to appear in the 1986 movie On Dangerous Ground, which was titled Choke Canyon in the United States.

The song was banned by the BBC during the Gulf War due to its address of war, nationalism and religion, as well as a direct reference to weaponry in the line, "There's a gun and ammunition just inside the doorway."

Composition
"Silent Running" was one of the first songs to come from the Rutherford/Robertson songwriting partnership. It was, in fact, one of a series of songs that the two wrote simply to test how effective collaboration between them would be. When producer Christopher Neil heard it on a demo tape that Rutherford played for him, however, he recommended that it be used for the album.

According to Rutherford, the song

When Rutherford was looking for a title for this particular song, he says, "I called it 'Silent Running', because I remembered that film so well, and our song, had a spacey feel to it."

Music video
The song's video features a few clips from the film Choke Canyon, but is primarily based on the completely unrelated story on which the song's lyrics are based. Billy Drago makes a cameo appearance in the video. It was produced by Paul Flattery and directed by Jim Yukich who had done many videos for Phil Collins and Genesis.

Chart performance

Covers

The Protomen released a cover of the song as a mash-up with their own song, "Breaking Out" in 2012 as a B-side to their single "I Drove All Night", with an extended cover of the song later appearing as the final song on their 2015 album, The Cover Up.

References

1985 debut singles
1985 songs
Mike + The Mechanics songs
Song recordings produced by Christopher Neil
Songs about time travel
Songs critical of religion
Songs written by Mike Rutherford
Songs written by BA Robertson
Atlantic Records singles